The year 1803 in science and technology involved some significant events.

Astronomy
 April 26 – A meteorite shower falls on L'Aigle in Normandy; Jean Baptiste Biot demonstrates that it is of extraterrestrial origin.

Botany
 Publication (posthumously) of André Michaux's Flora Boreali-Americana in Paris, the first flora of North America.
 University of Tartu Botanical Gardens established.

Chemistry
 January 1 – William Henry's formulation of his law on the solubility of gases first published.
 September 3 – English scientist John Dalton starts using symbols to represent the atoms of different chemical elements.
 October 21 – John Dalton's atomic theory and list of molecular weights first made known, at a lecture in Manchester.
 William Hyde Wollaston discovers the chemical element rhodium.
 Smithson Tennant discovers the chemical elements iridium and osmium.
 Cerium is discovered in Bastnäs (Sweden) by Jöns Jakob Berzelius and Wilhelm Hisinger, and independently in Germany by Martin Heinrich Klaproth.
 Claude Louis Berthollet publishes Essai de statique chimique in Paris.

Exploration
 June 9 – Matthew Flinders completes the first known circumnavigation of Australia.

Mathematics
 Gian Francesco Malfatti presents his conjecture regarding Malfatti circles.

Medicine
 Jean Marc Gaspard Itard first recognises pneumothorax.
 Dr Thomas Percival of Manchester publishes his Code of Medical Ethics, coining the expression medical ethics.

Meteorology
 Luke Howard publishes the basis of the modern classification and nomenclature of clouds.

Technology
 Robert Ransome invents the self-sharpening chilled cast-iron ploughshare in Ipswich, England.
 The first Fourdrinier continuous papermaking machine is installed in Hertfordshire, England.

Transport
 January 4 – William Symington demonstrates his Charlotte Dundas, the "first practical steamboat", in Scotland.
 July 26 – The Surrey Iron Railway, a wagonway between Wandsworth and Croydon, is opened, being the first public railway line in England.
 Thomas Telford begins work on construction of the Caledonian Canal and improving roads in Scotland.

Awards
 Copley Medal: Richard Chenevix

Births
 February 26 – Arnold Adolph Berthold, German physiologist (died 1861)
 February 28 – Christian Heinrich von Nagel, German geometer (died 1882)
 April 1 – Miles Joseph Berkeley, English cryptogamist (died 1889)
 May 12 – Justus von Liebig, German chemist (died 1873)
 May 24 – Charles Lucien Bonaparte, French naturalist (died 1857)
 June 8 – Amalia Assur, Swedish dentist (died 1889)
 July 31 – John Ericsson, Swedish-born mechanical engineer and inventor (died 1889)
 October 3 – John Gorrie, American physician and inventor (died 1855)
 October 6 – Heinrich Wilhelm Dove, Prussian physicist and climatologist (died 1879)
 October 16 – Robert Stephenson, English railway engineer (died 1859)
 November 29 – Christian Doppler, Austrian mathematician and discoverer of the Doppler effect (died 1853)
 December 21 – Joseph Whitworth, English mechanical engineer (died 1887)
 Choe Han-gi, Korean philosopher of science (died 1877)

Deaths
 May 8 – John Joseph Merlin, English inventor (born 1735)
 October 14 – Ami Argand, Genevan physicist and chemist (born 1750)

References

 
19th century in science
1800s in science